|- bgcolor="#FFFAFA" 

HD 173416 is an intermediate-mass giant star in the constellation Lyra. It is a 6th magnitude star, relatively bright for its distance of about 440 light years from Earth.

The star HD 173416 is named Xihe (羲和). The name was selected in the NameExoWorlds campaign by Nanjing, during the 100th anniversary of the IAU. Xihe is the goddess of the sun in the Chinese mythology and also represents the earliest astronomers and developers of calendars in ancient China.

Planetary system
In January 2009, a planet of the star was discovered. This object was detected using the radial velocity method by search programs conducted from the Xinglong Station in China and the  Okayama Astrophysical Observatory (OAO) in Japan.

See also 
 List of extrasolar planets

References

External links
 

G-type subgiants
173416
091852
Lyra (constellation)
Planetary systems with one confirmed planet
Durchmusterung objects
7043